Acanthocinus is a genus of longhorn beetles of the subfamily Lamiinae. It was described by Megerle in 1821.

Species
 Acanthocinus aedilis (Linnaeus, 1758)
 Acanthocinus angulosus (Casey, 1913)
 Acanthocinus elegans Ganglbauer, 1884
 Acanthocinus griseus (Fabricius, 1792)
 Acanthocinus henschi Reitter, 1900
 Acanthocinus leechi (Dillon, 1956)
 Acanthocinus nodosus (Fabricius, 1775)
 Acanthocinus obliquus (LeConte, 1862)
 Acanthocinus obsoletus (Olivier, 1795)
 Ponderosa pine bark borer, Acanthocinus princeps (Walker in Lord, 1866)   
 Acanthocinus pusillus Kirby in Richardson, 1837
 Acanthocinus reticulatus (Razoumowsky, 1789)
 Acanthocinus spectabilis (LeConte, 1854)

References

 
Acanthocinini
Cerambycidae genera